The 1971 Dartmouth Indians football team represented Dartmouth College during the 1971 NCAA University Division football season. The Indians were led by first-year head coach Jake Crouthamel and played their home games at Memorial Field in Hanover, New Hampshire. They finished with an overall record of 8–1, and an Ivy League record of 6–1, sharing the championship with Cornell.

Schedule

References

Dartmouth
Dartmouth Big Green football seasons
Ivy League football champion seasons
Dartmouth Indians football